The Apeman's Secret is the 62nd title of the Hardy Boys Mystery Stories, written by Franklin W. Dixon. Grosset & Dunlap published the book in 2005.

Plot summary
The Hardy Boys investigate the disappearance of an eighteen-year-old girl suspected of joining a sinister religious cult. A few days later the boys get an offbeat assignment from a comic book publisher: The real life double of his character, Apeman, is turning up everywhere and causing considerable damage. Frank and Joe tackle both cases and uncover an intricate scheme by a clever gang of crooks.

External links
Amazon.com entry

The Hardy Boys books
1980 American novels
1980 children's books